Pattada (Sardinian: Patàda, Pathàda) is a comune (municipality) in the Province of Sassari in the Italian region of Sardinia, located about  north of Cagliari and about  southeast of Sassari.

Pattada is known for the production of Sardinian knives, called resolzas. There are numerous knife shops where local artisans produce these blades by hand.  The resolza is a folding blade pocket knife.  Other knives include fixed blade types used by shepherds.  Most knives built in Pattada have handles made of ram horn. 

Some local luthiers gained a reputation for their products, mostly violins.

Many Pattadese are engaged in the production of Pecorino Sardo cheese and the surrounding countryside is largely pasture. Sheep are raised for milk, and the milk is made into cheese at the local co-operative.

Pattada borders the following municipalities: Benetutti, Buddusò, Bultei, Nughedu San Nicolò, Nule, Oschiri, Osidda, Ozieri.

References

Cities and towns in Sardinia